= Kandial =

Coordinates: 31°51′N 75°14′E

- Village
- Interactive map of Kandial
- Country: India
- State: Punjab
- District: Gurdaspur
- Tehsil: Batala
- Region: Majha

Government
  - Type: Panchayat raj
  - Body: Gram panchayat

Area
  - Total: 124 ha (310 acres)

Population (2011)
  - Total: 1,256; 656/600 ♂/♀
  - Scheduled Castes: 409; 217/192 ♂/♀
  - Total Households: 244

Languages
  - Official: Punjabi
- Time zone: UTC+5:30 (IST)
- Telephone: 01871
- ISO 3166 code: IN-PB
- Vehicle registration: PB-18
- Website: gurdaspur.nic.in

Kandial is a village in Batala in Gurdaspur district of Punjab State, India. It is located 4 kilometres (2.5 mi) from sub district headquarter, 26 kilometres (16 mi) from district headquarter. The village is administrated by Sarpanch an elected representative of the village.

== Demography ==
As of 2011, the village has a total number of 244 houses and a population of 1256 of which 656 are males while 600 are females. According to the report published by Census India in 2011, out of the total population of the village 409 people are from Schedule Caste and the village does not have any Schedule Tribe population so far.

== See also ==
- List of villages in India
